is a Japanese verb meaning  or . It is a Japanese given name used by either sex. Shinobu is also the dictionary form of  shinobi which can be combined with mono (者) to make shinobi no mono (忍びの者), an alternative name of ninja.

Possible writings
Shinobu can be written using different kanji characters and can mean:

as a given name
忍, "endurance/perseverance/patience"
清信, "purify, belief"
志信, "intention, belief"
as a male given name
信夫, "belief, man"
The name can also be written in hiragana or katakana, though hiragana is typically reserved for females and katakana for foreign-born Japanese.

People
Shinobu Adachi (忍, born 1958), Japanese voice actress and actress
Shinobu Asagoe (しのぶ, born 1976), Japanese professional tennis player
Shinobu Fukuhara (忍, born 1976), Japanese baseball pitcher
Shinobu Hashimoto (忍, born 1918), Japanese screenwriter, director, and producer
Shinobu "Inoran" Inoue (清信, born 1970), Japanese rock musician
Shinobu Ishihara (忍, 1879–1963), Japanese ophthalmologist
 Shinobu Iwane, professional shogi player
Shinobu Ito (born 1983), former Japanese football player
Shinobu Kandori (忍, born 1964), Japanese female wrestler and politician
Shinobu Muraki (born 1923), Japanese production designer and art director
Shinobu Nakayama (忍, born 1973), Japanese actress and a former J-pop singer
Shinobu Ohno (忍, born 1984), Japanese female football player
Shinobu Ohtaka (忍), Japanese manga artist
Shinobu Orikuchi (信夫, 1887–1953), Japanese ethnologist, linguist, folklorist, novelist, and poet
Shinobu Otake (しのぶ, born 1957), Japanese actress
Shinobu Otowa (しのぶ, born 1977), Japanese enka singer
Shinobu Sato (born 1955), Japanese classical artist
Shinobu Satouchi (信夫), Japanese voice actor
Shinobu Sekine (忍, born 1943), Japanese judoka
Shinobu Tanno (忍, born 1973), Japanese illustrator
Shinobu Tsukasa (忍, born 1942), Japanese yakuza overlord
Shinobu Yaguchi (史靖, born 1967), Japanese film director and screenwriter
Shinobu Sugawara, (菅原 忍, born 1980, Japanese professional wrestler)
Shinobu Wakanosato (忍, born 1976), Japanese professional sumo wrestler
Shinobu Kaitani (born 1967), manga artist and a recipient of the 1991 Tezuka Award
Shinobu Kitamoto (born 1977), Japanese sprint canoer
Shinobu Terajima (born 1972), Japanese actress
Shinobu Ikeda (born 1962), Japanese footballer

Characters
 Shinobu Kuki, a character in the video game Genshin Impact
Shinobu Oshino (忍), a character in the light novel and anime series Monogatari 
Shinobu Jacobs (シノブ), a character in the video game No More Heroes
Shinobu Handa, a character in the anime and manga series Shōjo Sect
Shinobu Ijūin (忍), a character in the manga and anime series Haikara-san ga Tōru
Shinobu Inuyose, a character from the music media franchise D4DJ
Shinobu Kagurazaka (忍), a character in the manga and anime series Tenjho Tenge
Shinobu Maehara (しのぶ), a character in the manga and anime series Love Hina
Shinobu Miyake (しのぶ), a character in the manga and anime series Urusei Yatsura
Shinobu Morita (忍), a character in the manga, anime, and TV drama series Honey and Clover
Shinobu Kamiki (上喜しのぶ) a character in the Mobile Games and anime series Princess Connect! Re:Dive
Shinobu Kocho (しのぶ), a supporting character in the manga and anime series Demon Slayer: Kimetsu no Yaiba.
Shinobu Sensui (忍), a character from the anime and manga series YuYu Hakusho
Shinobu (忍), a ninja trainee in "2x2 Shinobuden", aka Ninja Nonsense
Shinobu, a chinchilla on the animated sitcom Bob's Burgers
Shinobu Takeda, a fictional character that appears in the comic book series W.I.T.C.H.
Shinobu Takatsuki, a character in the anime and manga series Junjo Romantica
Shinobu Fujiwara (藤原忍), a character in the anime series Dancouga – Super Beast Machine God
Captain Shinobu Nagumo, a character in Mobile Police Patlabor
Shinobu Kawajiri (しのぶ), a minor character in the manga and anime series Diamond is Unbreakable.
Shinobu Sengoku, a character from the game franchise Ensemble Stars!

References

Japanese unisex given names